The Saastal or the Saas Valley is an alpine valley in the district of Visp, in the eastern part of the Canton of Valais, Switzerland. It is the valley of the river Saaser Vispa. It is separated from the Mattertal to the west by the Mischabel massif. Villages in the valley are, upstream, Eisten, Saas-Balen, Saas-Grund, Saas-Fee and Saas-Almagell.

Until 1893, the municipalities of Almagell, Balen, Fee and Grund were a single parish, with the only church in Grund. Mattmarksee is a reservoir built in the 1960s.

The region hosts an extensive winter sports region, comprising the separate ski areas of Saas-Fee, Saas-Grund and Saas-Almagell. As well as individual ski passes a combined pass is available; each of these areas is connected to the other parts of the region by postal bus, rather than dedicated skilifts.

Saas
Landforms of Valais
Valleys of the Alps